Leonel Martiniano de Alencar, Baron of Alencar (Fortaleza, December 5, 1832 – March 25, 1921) was a Brazilian lawyer and diplomat, who served as the ambassador of Brazil in many occasions. He was the son of famous politician José Martiniano Pereira de Alencar, and the younger brother of famous novelist José de Alencar.

Condecorated with the Military Order of Christ, the Order of Isabella the Catholic, the Order of the Rose and the Order of Christ, he was a member of the Brazilian Historic and Geographic Institute and received the title of Baron of Alencar in 1885, in a post that would last until the proclamation of Republic in Brazil, in 1889, when all the titles of nobility in Brazil were abolished.

References 

1832 births
1921 deaths
Brazilian diplomats
Ambassadors of Brazil to Uruguay
Ambassadors of Brazil to Venezuela
Brazilian nobility
19th-century Brazilian lawyers